The name Hippomenes may also refer to the father of Leimone.
In Greek mythology, Hippomenes, also known as Melanion (Μελανίων or  Μειλανίων), was a son of the Arcadian Amphidamas or of King Megareus of Onchestus and the husband of Atalanta. He was known to have been one of the disciples of Chiron, and to have surpassed other disciples in his eagerness to undertake hard challenges. Inscriptions mention him as one of the Calydonian hunters.

Mythology 

The main myth of Hippomenes' courtship of Atalanta, narrated by Pseudo-Apollodorus, Ovid, Servius, and Hyginus was as follows.

Hippomenes fell in love with Atalanta, the virgin huntress who strongly disliked the idea of getting married. After a warning from an oracle about getting married, she declared that whoever wanted to marry her was to beat her in a footrace (herself being a notoriously swift runner), and that those who should try and lose would be punished by instant death.
Another version (followed by Hyginus) was that her father wanted her to be married, but she did not. She agreed to running races against her suitors because she thought she would never lose.

Atalanta raced all her suitors and outran all but Hippomenes, who defeated her by cunning, not speed. Hippomenes knew that he could not win a fair race with Atalanta, so he prayed to Aphrodite for help (the goddess, in the meantime, disliked Atalanta's neglect of love).

Aphrodite gave him three golden apples – which came from her sacred apple-tree in Tamasus, Cyprus, according to Ovid, or from the garden of the Hesperides according to Servius – and told him to drop them one at a time to distract Atalanta. After each of the first two apples, Atalanta was able to recover the lead, but when she stopped for the third, Hippomenes won the race. It took all three apples and all of his speed, but Hippomenes was finally successful, winning the race and Atalanta's hand.

Atalanta and Hippomenes were turned into lions by Cybele as punishment after having sex in one of her temples they entered to take a rest during their journey to Hippomenes' home (the Greeks believed that lions could not mate with other lions, but only with leopards). Ovid and Servius suggest that Hippomenes forgot to pay the tribute to Aphrodite he had promised for helping him, and consequently, during the two's stay at Cybele's temple, Aphrodite caused them to have sex after going mad with lust, knowing that this would offend Cybele, and this indeed resulted in Cybele (or Zeus according to Hyginus) transforming them into lions. Thereafter they drew Cybele's chariot, which Servius equates with the Earth itself.

According to some accounts, Hippomenes (Melanion) was the father of Parthenopaeus; yet others stated Atalanta had her son by either Ares or Meleager prior to her marriage to Hippomenes.

Notes

References 

 Apollodorus, The Library with an English Translation by Sir James George Frazer, F.B.A., F.R.S. in 2 Volumes, Cambridge, MA, Harvard University Press; London, William Heinemann Ltd. 1921. . Online version at the Perseus Digital Library. Greek text available from the same website.
Gaius Julius Hyginus, Fabulae from The Myths of Hyginus translated and edited by Mary Grant. University of Kansas Publications in Humanistic Studies. Online version at the Topos Text Project.
 Maurus Servius Honoratus, In Vergilii carmina comentarii. Servii Grammatici qui feruntur in Vergilii carmina commentarii; recensuerunt Georgius Thilo et Hermannus Hagen. Georgius Thilo. Leipzig. B. G. Teubner. 1881. Online version at the Perseus Digital Library.
 Pausanias, Description of Greece with an English Translation by W.H.S. Jones, Litt.D., and H.A. Ormerod, M.A., in 4 Volumes. Cambridge, MA, Harvard University Press; London, William Heinemann Ltd. 1918. . Online version at the Perseus Digital Library
 Pausanias, Graeciae Descriptio. 3 vols. Leipzig, Teubner. 1903.  Greek text available at the Perseus Digital Library.
 Publius Ovidius Naso, Metamorphoses translated by Brookes More (1859-1942). Boston, Cornhill Publishing Co. 1922. Online version at the Perseus Digital Library.
 Publius Ovidius Naso, Metamorphoses. Hugo Magnus. Gotha (Germany). Friedr. Andr. Perthes. 1892. Latin text available at the Perseus Digital Library.
 Sextus Propertius, Elegies from Charm. Vincent Katz. trans. Los Angeles. Sun & Moon Press. 1995. Online version at the Perseus Digital Library. Latin text available at the same website.
Theocritus, Idylls from The Greek Bucolic Poets translated by Edmonds, J M. Loeb Classical Library Volume 28. Cambridge, MA. Harvard University Press. 1912. Online version at theoi.com
 Theocritus, Idylls edited by R. J. Cholmeley, M.A. London. George Bell & Sons. 1901. Greek text available at the Perseus Digital Library.

Metamorphoses characters
Metamorphoses into animals in Greek mythology
Deeds of Zeus
Arcadian mythology
Love stories
Deeds of Aphrodite